Stayner (Clearview Field) Aerodrome  is located  west southwest of Stayner, Ontario, Canada.

References

Registered aerodromes in Ontario